The Smith Special also known as "Smitty's Termite" or simply the Smith Termite is a single place homebuilt aircraft built primarily out of wood.

Design and development
Wilbur L. Smith, was an experienced wooden construction aircraft homebuilder, having built a Pietenpol Sky Scout in 1930.  He designed the Termite using chalk on a basement floor. Don Cookman later drew up the plans.

The aircraft is a braced parasol wing monoplane with all-wood construction. The exception being the motor mount, struts and landing gear are made out of steel. It was designed to use an engine from an Aeronca aircraft. Spruce was used as the structural material with birch plywood covering. The spars are from an Aeronca K. The controls are modified from a Piper Cub. The aircraft does not have brakes or a tailwheel.

Operational history
A Continental A-40 was installed after an engine failure resulted in a forced landing, flipping the aircraft on its back during testing.

Aircraft on display
The Smith Special "Termite" is displayed at the Oregon Air & Space Museum in Eugene, Oregon. The fabric covering has been removed to show the all wood construction.

Specifications (Smith Special "Termite")

See also

References

Homebuilt aircraft
Tourist attractions in Eugene, Oregon
1950s United States civil utility aircraft
Parasol-wing aircraft
Single-engined tractor aircraft
Termite aircraft
Aircraft first flown in 1957